The 2003 World Table Tennis Championships men's singles was the 47th edition of the men's singles championship.

Werner Schlager defeated Joo Sae-hyuk in the final, winning four sets to two to secure the title.

Finals

References

External links
 Main draw archived from ITTF.
 Players' matches. ITTF.
 WM 2003 Paris (Frankreich). tt-wiki.info (in German).

-